Thulborn is an Anglo-Saxon surname dating back to the late 12th century AD, derived from the baptismal name for the "son of Thurburn". Notable people with the surname include:

Richard A. Thulborn, British paleontologist
Scott Thulborn (born 1984), Australian lawn bowls player

See also
Thorburn
Thoburn
Torbjörn
Thurber (disambiguation)
Turbin